Caroline Stanford is a British historian and author.

Stanford was educated at Jesus College, Oxford, Birkbeck, University of London and Oxford Brookes University, she has been historian at The Landmark Trust since 2001.

In 2013, she launched The Landmark Trust's 50 For Free scheme, which offers a number of free stays in Landmark Trust Properties to charities, educational schemes and carers.

Selected publications 
Landmark: A History of Britain in 50 Buildings, with Anna Keay (2015, Frances Lincoln Publishers)
Dearest Augustus and I: The Journal of Jane Pugin, Editor (2004, Spire Books Ltd)
On Preserving Our Ruins (2000, Journal of Architectural Conservation)

Filmography
Time Team (2007)
Walking Through History (2013)

References

External links
Caroline Stanford profile at The Landmark Trust
 

Living people
Alumni of Oxford Brookes University
British historians
British writers
Year of birth missing (living people)